Murupaenga (died 1826) was a notable New Zealand tribal leader and war leader of the Ngāti Rango (or Ngāti Rongo) hapū (subtribe) of the Ngāti Whātua iwi. He was a leader in many battles including the defeat of Ngāpuhi forces by Ngāti Whātua in the Te Kai-a-te-karoro battle at Moremonui in 1807 or 1808. Ngāti Rango lived in the South Kaipara area and Murupaenga lived at Makarau during the time when he was most prominent.

References

1826 deaths
New Zealand military personnel
Ngāti Whātua people
Year of birth unknown